Price Creek is a stream in the U.S. state of Iowa.

Price Creek is named after Abraham Price, a pioneer settler.

References

Rivers of Iowa
Rivers of Mahaska County, Iowa
Rivers of Marion County, Iowa